Sudan I (also commonly known as CI Solvent Yellow 14 and Solvent Orange R) is an organic compound, typically classified as an azo dye. It is an intensely orange-red solid that is added to colourise waxes, oils, petrol, solvents, and polishes. Sudan I has also been adopted for colouring various foodstuffs, especially curry powder and chili powder, although the use of Sudan I in foods is now banned in many countries, because Sudan I, Sudan III, and Sudan IV have been classified as category 3 carcinogens (not classifiable as to its carcinogenicity to humans) by the International Agency for Research on Cancer. Sudan I is still used in some orange-coloured smoke formulations and as a colouring for cotton refuse used in chemistry experiments.

Application
The Sudan dyes are a group of azo compounds which have been used to color hydrocarbon solvents, oils, fats, waxes, shoes, and floor polishes.

Sudan I and Sudan III (1-(4-(phenyldiazenyl)phenyl) azonaphthalen-2-ol) are used for mostly the same application. Sudan III melts at a 68 °C higher temperature than Sudan I.

Synthesis
The synthesis of Sudan I involves the reaction of phenyldiazonium salts with 2-naphthol.

Sudan I suffers from oxidative photo-degradation by two mechanisms, singlet oxygen degradation and free radical degradation, decreasing its fastness on materials.

Degradation and metabolism
The metabolism of Sudan I, as characterized in rabbits, involves both oxidative or reductive reactions.

Azo-reduction of Sudan I produces aniline and 1-amino-2-naphthol, and this reaction seems to be responsible for the detoxification. In vivo, after oxidation of Sudan I, C-hydroxylated metabolites are formed as major oxidation products and are excreted in urine. These metabolites are also found after oxidation with rat hepatic microsomes in vitro.

The C-hydroxylated metabolites may be considered as the detoxication products, while the benzenediazonium ion (BDI) formed by microsome-catalyzed enzymatic splitting of the azo group of Sudan I, reacts with DNA in vitro. The major DNA adduct formed in this reaction is identified as the 8-(phenylazo)guanine adduct, which was also found in liver DNA of rats who were exposed to Sudan I.

The formation of C-hydroxylated metabolites and DNA-adducts from Sultan I oxidation were also demonstrated with human CYP enzymes, with CYP1A1 being the major enzyme involved in the oxidation of Sudan I in human tissues rich in this enzyme, while CYP3A4 is also active in human liver.

The expression of CYP1A1 in human livers is low, less than 0,7% of the total hepatic CYP expression, while it contributes up to 12 to 30% in the oxidation of Sudan I in a set of human liver microsomes. Moreover, Sultan I strongly induces CYP1A1 in rats and human cells in culture, due to activation of the cytosolic aryl hydrocarbon receptor.

In bladder tissue, CYP enzymes are not detectable, while there are relatively high levels of peroxidases expressed in these tissues. In addition to oxidation by CYP enzymes, Sudan I and its C-hydroxylated metabolites are also oxidized by peroxidases, such as a model plant peroxidase, but also by the mammalian enzyme, cyclooxygenase. As a consequence DNA, RNA and protein adducts are formed. (See figure 2).

Therefore, peroxidase-catalyzed activation of Sudan I has been suggested, in a similar way to other carcinogens, such as the carcinogenic aromatic amines.

It is suggested that a CYP- or peroxidase-mediated activation of Sudan I or a combination of both mechanisms as an explanation for the organ specificity of this carcinogen for liver and urinary bladder in animals. The Sudan I metabolites formed by peroxidase are much less likely to be formed at physiological conditions, because in vivo there are many nucleophilic molecules present which scavenge the Sudan I reactive species. Hence, formation of adducts of Sudan I reactive species with nucleophilic species, such as DNA, tRNA, proteins, polynucleotides, and polydeoxynucleotides seems to be the preferred reaction under physiological conditions, with deoxyguanosine as the major target for Sudan-I DNA binding, followed by deoxyadenosine.

Effect on humans
Sudan 1 is a compound being warned of for health hazards by the EU regulation. It may cause allergic skin reactions and irritation of the skin. Exposure to the skin can happen by direct exposure to textile workers or by wearing tight-fitting textiles dyed with Sudan 1. Allergic reactions are induced when the azo dye binds to the human serum albumin (HSA), forming a dye-HSA conjugate, which immunoglobulin E binds to, which causes a release of histamine.

Sudan 1 is also suspected of causing genetic defects. The mutagenicity and genetic hazard has been evaluated with the Ames-test and animal experiments. Further it is more suspected of causing cancer. The carcinogenicity is estimated by animal testing.

Safety and regulation
The regulation of Sudan 1 in Europe started in 2003 after repeated notifications were published in the EU rapid alert system. The EU rapid alert system announced that Sudan I was found in chili powder and the foods that were prepared with it. Due to the suspicion of genotoxicity and mutagenicity of Sudan 1, a daily intake was not tolerable. The fast reaction of the European Commission was it to prohibit the import of chili and hot chili products. Also the BfR (Bundesinstitut fuer Risikobewertung) was asked for their opinion and came to the conclusion that Sudan dyes are principally harmful to the health. Sudan I was classified as a category three carcinogen and category three mutagen in Annex I of the Directive 67/548/EC. This classification was based on findings from animal experiments, conducted by the Federal institute for Risk Assessment (BfR).

The regulation of azo colorants by ‘The EU azo Colorants Directive 2002/61/EC’ has been replaced by the REACH regulation in 2009, when azo dyes where put on the REACH Restriction list Annex XVII. This includes that these dyes are forbidden to be used in textiles and leather, that may come in direct and prolonged contact with the skin or oral cavity. No textile of leather product are allowed to be colored with azo dyes a specific list of the items can be found in the Official Journal of the European Union. Furthermore, it is prohibited to place any textile or leather articles colored with azo dyes on the market.

A certificate for azo dyes exists to ensure that dyes that cleave to one of the forbidden amines are not being used for dyeing. All dyers should ensure that the supply company is fully informed about the legislation of the prohibited azo dyes. To ensure this, they should be members of the EDAD (Ecological and Toxicological Association of Dyes and Organic Pigments Manufacturers) from which they can receive their certificate. Non-ETAD member sources suppliers correlate with doubt about the origin and safety of the dyes. Dyes without certification are not advised to be used.

Toxicology, genotoxicity, and mutagenesis

Humans
No specific information exists on Sudan 1 related to the toxic, genotoxic, and mutagenic effect on humans.

Animal Experiments
Sudan 1 was associated with a significant increase in neoplastic nodules and carcinomas in, both male and female rats. Under conditions of other studies, no significantly increased incidence of micro-nucleated hepatocytes were found after the administration of Sudan 1. These results suggest that the liver carcinogenicity may not be due to the genotoxic effects of Sudan 1. No carcinogenic effects were visible in livers of mice after the application of Sudan 1. But when Sudan 1 is applied subcutaneously to mice, liver tumors were found.

Furthermore, DNA damage was depicted in the stomach and liver cells of mice. In rats there was found to be no significant increase in the amount of micro-nucleated epithelial cells of the gastrointestinal tract. This indicates the absence of genotoxic compounds in the gastrointestinal epithelial cells in rats.

Contradictive to the findings in the gastrointestinal tract and liver, there was an increase in micro-nucleated cells found in the bone marrow. The frequency of micro-nucleated bone marrow cells increased in a dose-dependent manner. Significantly higher incidences of micro-nucleated immature erythrocytes (MNIME)were found at a dose of 150/mg/day or more. This supports the explanation that Sudan 1 is oxidized or activated by peroxidase in the blood cells and thereby forming micro-nucleated cells.

Guanosine DNA adducts derived from peroxidase metabolites of Sudan 1 were also found in vivo in the bladder of rats. The bladder also contains high levels of tissue peroxidase.

Toxicology
Sudan I is genotoxic. It is also carcinogenic in rats. Comparisons between experimental animals and human Cytochrome P450 (CYP) strongly suggest animal carcinogenicity data can be extrapolated to humans.

Sudan I is also present as an impurity in Sunset Yellow FCF, which is its disulfonated water-soluble version.

Food scare
In February 2005, Sudan I gained attention, particularly in the United Kingdom. A worcestershire sauce produced by Premier Foods was found to be contaminated with Sudan I. The origin was traced to adulterated chili powder. The contamination was discovered by the Food Standards Agency.

See also
Para Red

References

External links
BBC NEWS | Health | Food alert on cancer-causing dye
Food Standards Agency - Sudan dyes

2-Naphthols
Azo dyes
Food colorings
IARC Group 3 carcinogens
Sudan dyes